The Natural History Museum of Isfahan, Iran, is located in a building that dates from the 15th century Timurid era. The building includes large halls and a veranda which are decorated by muqarnas and stucco. This building became a museum in 1988.

Halls 
The museum has seven halls:
Guidance hall
Invertebrates hall, containing: Unicellular organisms, sponges, corals, echinoderms, mollusca, arthropods, insects, and rare seashells. These often come from the Pacific Oceans and Atlantic Oceans.  
Botany hall has different kinds of flowering plants, whole plants, medicinal plants, and tree trunks from Iran's jungles of 180 million years ago.
Geology hall contains all constituents of the Earth's solid crust, including minerals, crystals, ore, and sedimentary rocks. 
Hall of physical geography and map of geology, plants, animals, ... 
Vertebrates hall is the museum's largest room and contains different kinds of fish, amphibians, reptiles, birds, and mammals, which are kept as taxidermy specimens.
Hall of Graphic training aids

Architecture    
This building has several large halls and a porch decorated with Muqarnas and stucco. There are plastic dinosaurs in front of the building which some may regard as incongruous with the building's architecture.

Gallery

See Also 
Ministry of Cultural Heritage, Handicrafts and Tourism
Iran National Heritage List
List of historical structures in Isfahan Province

References 

Museums in Isfahan
Natural history museums in Iran